Hoffmannilena is a genus of spiders in the family Agelenidae. It was first described in 2016 by Maya-Morales & Jiménez. This genus was named in honour of Anita Hoffmann. , it contains 9 species:  8 from Mexico, H. nova from Guatemala.

Species
Hoffmannilena comprises the following species:
Hoffmannilena apoala Maya-Morales & Jiménez, 2016
Hoffmannilena cumbre Maya-Morales & Jiménez, 2016
Hoffmannilena huajuapan Maya-Morales & Jiménez, 2016
Hoffmannilena lobata (F. O. Pickard-Cambridge, 1902)
Hoffmannilena marginata (F. O. Pickard-Cambridge, 1902)
Hoffmannilena mitla Maya-Morales & Jiménez, 2016
Hoffmannilena nova (O. Pickard-Cambridge, 1896) 
Hoffmannilena tizayuca Maya-Morales & Jiménez, 2016
Hoffmannilena variabilis (F. O. Pickard-Cambridge, 1902)

References

Agelenidae
Araneomorphae genera
Spiders of Mexico
Spiders of Central America